The Batman/Superman Hour is a Filmation animated series that was broadcast on CBS from 1968 to 1969. Premiering on September 14, 1968, this 60-minute program featured new adventures of the DC Comics superheroes Batman, Robin and Batgirl alongside shorts from The New Adventures of Superman and The Adventures of Superboy.

Series overview

This series marked the animation debut of Batman, his supporting cast and some of their classic enemies like Joker, Penguin, Riddler, Catwoman, Mr. Freeze, Scarecrow, Mad Hatter, and some villains exclusive to the series.

The success of The Superman/Aquaman Hour of Adventure in 1967 had prompted Filmation to produce a Metamorpho pilot and begin development on other similar series. These plans were cancelled when CBS secured the animation rights to Batman in the wake of ABC's recent success with the Batman live action television series. Going into production close to the start of the 1968 TV season, what would become The Batman/Superman Hour required Filmation to pull as many additional animators from other projects as they could spare to ramp up production.

This series was the first time Olan Soule and Casey Kasem performed as the voices of Batman and Robin. When The New Adventures of Batman was produced in 1977, Adam West and Burt Ward reprised the roles they had originally played in the live action TV series. Soule and Kasem would return several times to reprise their roles in 1972's The New Scooby-Doo Movies, 1973's Super Friends, 1977's The All-New Super Friends Hour, 1978's Challenge of the Super Friends, 1979's The World's Greatest Super Friends, and starting in 1980 Soule voiced the character in the 7 minute shorter episodes that were produced through 1983. These 1980–1983 episodes aired under the generic Super Friends title. Kasem would go on to voice Robin with Adam West as Batman in 1984's Super Friends: The Legendary Super Powers Show and 1985's The Super Powers Team: Galactic Guardians.

In 1969, the series was repackaged into 30-minute episodes without the Superman segments and renamed Batman with Robin the Boy Wonder. Batman would next appear in The New Adventures of Batman in 1977. In 1985, Warner Home Video released five selected episodes of the series on VHS as part of the "Super Powers" video collection. These videos were re-released in 1996 and are out of print. In 1996, episodes were included in The Superman/Batman Adventures on the USA Network. They later aired on the Cartoon Network and Boomerang.

Episodes

The Superman portion of the program consisted of new 6-minute shorts from Filmation's The New Adventures of Superman and The Adventures of Superboy.

The Batman half of The Batman/Superman Hour consisted of new shorts. One story was presented in two 6 minute segments and one story in a single 6 minute segment. Thirty-four stories were produced.

Cast
 Olan Soule as Batman, Alfred Pennyworth
 Casey Kasem as Robin, Chief O'Hara, Mayor of Gotham City, Additional Voices
 Jane Webb as Batgirl, Catwoman
 Ted Knight as Narrator (Batman and Superboy segments), James Gordon, Penguin, Riddler, Mr. Freeze, Scarecrow, Mad Hatter, Tweedledum and Tweedledee, Simon the Pieman, Dollman, Judge
 Bud Collyer as Superman
 Bob Hastings as Superboy / Young Clark Kent
 Jackson Beck as Lex Luthor, Narrator (Superman segments)
 Jack Grimes as Jimmy Olsen
 Joan Alexander and Julie Bennett as Lois Lane

Production credits
 Directed by Hal Sutherland
 Associate Directors: Rudy Larriva, Amby Paliwoda, Don Towsley, Lou Zukor
 Art Director: Don Christensen
 Storyboard: Sherman Labby, Oscar Dufau, Mike O'Connor, Jan Green, Gary Lund
 Layout: Dan Noonan, Ray Vinella, Herb Hazelton, C.L. Hartman, Jacques Rupp, Ray Jacobs, Kay Wright, Louise Sandoval, Takashi Masunaga, Mike Ploog, Bill Lignante, Marilee Heyer, Alberto DeMello, Dick Preisen, Frank Gonzales, Mel Keefer, Sylvia Mattinson, Kay Wright
 Background Director: Erv Kaplan
 Background Artists: Paul Xander, Bill Geach, Martin Forte, Jack Healey, Ted Littlefield, Art Lozzi, Jim Jones, Maurice Harvey, Venetia Epler, Bill McArdle, Lorraine Marue, Ann Guenther, Barbara Smith
 Animation: Bill Hajee, Ralph Somerville, Len Rogers, Murray McClellan, Len Redman, James Brummett, Bob Carr, Russ Von Neida, Bob Bransford, Joan Orbison, Bill Pratt, Marshall Lamore, Robert Bentley, Jack Foster, Norm McCabe, George Grandpre, Judy Drake, Bill Reed, Chic Otterstrom, Les Kaluza, Xenia, Bill Hutten, Otto Feuer, Ken Southworth, Jack Ozark, Reuben Timmins, Ed Friedman, Butch Davis, Virgil Raddatz, Bob Trochim, Virgil Ross, Tom McDonald, Dave Tendlar, Bob Matz, Paul Krukowski, Dick Hall
 Camera Supervision: Roger Brown
 Camera:  Ray Lee, Ron LaPeer, Gary Milton, Sergio Antonio Alcazar, Roger Sims
 Editorial: Joseph Simon
 Negative Cutting: June Gilham
 Sound Effects: Enfeld Mahana Corp.
 Prints by Technicolor
 Production Coordinator: Rock Benedict
 Checking Supervisor: Marion Turk
 Ink and Paint Supervision: Martha Buckley
 Voices: Bud Collyer (Clark Kent/Superman); Bob Hastings (Superboy); Ted Knight (Narrator/all Batman villains); Joan Alexander (Lois Lane); Casey Kasem (Dick Grayson/Robin); Jackson Beck (Lex Luthor); Olan Soule (Bruce Wayne/Batman); Jack Grimes (James "Jimmy" Olsen); Jane Webb (Barbara Gordon/Batgirl; all villainesses); Cliff Owens
 Background Music: John Gart
 Executive Producer: Allen Ducovny
 Produced by Norm Prescott, Lou Scheimer

See also
 The New Adventures of Batman
 The Batman/Tarzan Adventure Hour

References

External links
 Batman Superman Hour at Big Cartoon DataBase
 
 Batman: Yesterday, Today and Beyond - The Batman Homepage - The Adventures of Batman
 The Big Cartoon Database - Batman Cartoon Info

1968 American television series debuts
1969 American television series endings
1960s American animated television series
American children's animated action television series
American children's animated adventure television series
American children's animated science fiction television series
American children's animated superhero television series
Animated Superman television series
CBS original programming
English-language television shows
Animated television shows based on DC Comics
Batman television series by Filmation
Superman television series by Filmation
Television shows directed by Hal Sutherland